Lathyrus ochrus, the Cyprus vetch, is a species of annual herb in the family Fabaceae. They are climbers and have compound, broad leaves. Flowers are visited by Old World swallowtails and Oxythyrea funesta.

Sources

References 

ochrus
Flora of Malta